Noel Buck (born April 5, 2005) is an American professional soccer player who plays as a midfielder for Major League Soccer club New England Revolution.

Career

Youth
Raised in Arlington, Massachusetts, Buck joined the New England Revolution academy in 2017 from New England Futbol Club. In 2021, Buck spent time with the club's USL League One affiliate team New England Revolution II. He made his debut on April 10, 2021, starting against Fort Lauderdale CF.

Professional
On January 18, 2022, Buck signed a homegrown player contract with New England Revolution.

He scored his first goal at the MLS level on September 4, 2022, in a 3-0 win over New York City FC, making him the second youngest scorer in team history, behind only Diego Fagúndez.

References

2005 births
American soccer players
Association football midfielders
Living people
Soccer players from Massachusetts
New England Revolution II players
New England Revolution players
USL League One players
People from Arlington, Massachusetts
Sportspeople from Middlesex County, Massachusetts
Homegrown Players (MLS)
MLS Next Pro players
Major League Soccer players